Joseph Richard Burke (born February 9, 1961) is a former American football running back. He played for the New York Jets in 1987.

References

1961 births
Living people
People from Albany, New York
Players of American football from New York (state)
American football running backs
Rutgers Scarlet Knights football players
New York Jets players
National Football League replacement players